The Badakhshana rock agama (Paralaudakia badakhshana) is an agamid lizard found in NE Afghanistan, N Pakistan, Kashmir, China (Xinjiang), SE Turkmenistan, eastward through Tajikistan to W Kyrgyzstan.

Type locality: Mazar-i-Sharif, northern Afghanistan, 36° 34' N, 67° 05' E, 457 m elevation.

References

  Ananjeva N B; Peters G; Rzepakovsky V T 1981 New species of the mountain agamas from Tadjikistan, Agama chernovi sp. nov. TRUDY ZOOLOGICHESKOGO INSTITUTA AKADEMII NAUK SSSR 101 1981: 23-27
 Ananjeva, N.B. & Tuniev 1994 Some aspects of historical biogeography of Asian rock agamids Russ. J. Herpetol. 1 (1): 43
 Baig, K.J. & Böhme, W. 1995 Partition of the Stellio-group of Agama. 8th Ord. Gen. Meet. Soc. Europ. Herpet.: 36

Paralaudakia
Reptiles of Pakistan
Reptiles of Afghanistan
Reptiles of Central Asia
Reptiles described in 1969
Taxa named by Steven C. Anderson
Taxa named by Alan E. Leviton